Michael Greene, aka Fort Romeau, is an electronic music producer and DJ from the United Kingdom.

Background
Born in Chester, Greene grew up in Oxfordshire and went on to study Music and Visual Art in Brighton. After graduating he moved to London and joined electro-pop duo La Roux as part of their touring band.

In 2012 Greene left La Roux and released his debut album Kingdoms on US label 100% Silk. EPs have been released on the Running Back and Live At Robert Johnson labels, in addition to songs on compilations from Rush Hour, Cocoon, Correspondent and Mule Musiq.

In 2013 Greene signed with Ghostly International and released his second LP Insides in 2015, an eclectic mixture of house, kraut, ambient and techno.

In 2015 Greene and Ali Tillett set up record label Cin Cin, putting out a diverse range of split EPs from new and established artists alike, including Nick Höppner, Ripperton and Todd Osbourne.

Greene has also released an EP with Massimiliano Pagliara under the name The Violet Hour, on Cocktail D'Amore and collaborated with Chris Baio of Vampire Weekend as C.Y.M.

Discography

Studio albums 
 Kingdoms (2012, 100% Silk)
 Insides (2015, Ghostly International)
 Beings of Light (2022, Ghostly International)

EPs
 Stay True (2013, Ghostly International)
 Fairlights (2015, Running Back) 
 Fort Romeau Frankfurt Versions (2015, Ghostly International)
 Untitled/ Splicing Fort Romeau & Nick Höppner (2015, Cin Cin) 
 Purify/ Korgs Bézier & Fort Romeau (2016, Cin Cin)
 Heaven & Earth (2019, Permanent Vacation)

Singles
 SW9 (2013, Ghostly International)
 Jetée/ Desire (2013, Ghostly International) 
 Her Dream (2014, Live at Robert Johnson) 
 Secrets & Lies (2016, Live at Robert Johnson)
 Reasons (2017, self-released)

Compilations
 Musik For Autobahns 2 (2015, Rush Hour)
 Correspondant Compilation 05 (2017, Correspondent Music) 
 Lifesaver compilation (2017, Live at Robert Johnson)
 The Sound of Café Del Mar (2017, Café del Mar Music)
 Cocoon Compilation Q (2017, Cocoon)

Remixes
 Deliverance, RY X (Fort Romeau Remix)
 "Something Good", Alt J (Fort Romeau Remix)
 "Through the Yard", Kauf (Fort Romeau Remix)
 "Time Eater", Gold Panda (Fort Romeau Remix)
 "Feeling's Gone", Beacon (Fort Romeau Remix)
 Go Back (Feat. Damon Albarn), Tony Allen (Fort Romeau Remix)
 Conversations, Woman's Hour (Fort Romeau Remix)
 The Fall, Frankie Rosie (Fort Romeau Remix)
 Free Your Mind, Cut Copy (Fort Romeau Remix)
 ByBy, Lauer (Fort Romeau Remix)
 No Excuse, Jacques Greene (Fort Romeau Remix)
 Community, Gold Panda (Fort Romeau Remix)
 Need Your Love, The Temper Trap (Fort Romeau Remix)
 Head, Pend Mason (Fort Romeau Remix)
 Perspective'', Adana Twins (Fort Romeau Remix)

References

Living people
British DJs
Year of birth missing (living people)